Daniel Steiger (born 21 August 1966) is a Swiss former road cyclist. He competed in the road race at the 1988 Summer Olympics. He also rode in three editions of the Giro d'Italia.

Major results

1988
GP Tell
1st Stages 1, 2 & 5
1st Prologue Circuit Franco-Belge
1989
2nd Overall GP Tell
1st Stages 2 & 3
2nd Overall Tour de Suisse
6th Firenze–Pistoia
1990
2nd Time trial, National Road Championships
2nd Firenze–Pistoia
4th Overall Tour de Suisse
9th Overall Tirreno–Adriatico
1991
1st Trofeo Matteotti
6th Trofeo Laigueglia
1992
3rd GP Industria & Artigianato di Larciano
7th Firenze–Pistoia

References

External links
 

1966 births
Living people
Swiss male cyclists
Olympic cyclists of Switzerland
Cyclists at the 1988 Summer Olympics
Sportspeople from the canton of Schwyz